Issa bin Saad Al Jafali Al Nuaimi is the Qatari Attorney General. Previously he had served as the Minister of Justice and Minister of State for the Council of Ministers Affairs from 2018 until 2021. He was succeeded Masoud al Ameri.

References 

Living people
21st-century Qatari politicians
Qatari politicians
Government ministers of Qatar
Year of birth missing (living people)